Ignacio Buse (born 25 March 2004) is a Peruvian tennis player.

Buse has a career high ATP singles ranking of 719 achieved on 16 January 2023. He also has a career high ATP doubles ranking of 587 achieved on 12 September 2022.

Buse represents Peru at the Davis Cup, where he has a W/L record of 0–0. He signed to play college tennis at the University of Georgia, and is considered to be one of the most promising prospects coming out of Peru along with his friend Gonzalo Bueno.

Buse is the nephew of world-renowned chef Gastón Acurio.

Tour finals

Singles

Doubles

References

External links

2004 births
Living people
Peruvian male tennis players
Sportspeople from Lima
Georgia Bulldogs tennis players